Joel Cooper may refer to:
Joel D. Cooper, thoracic surgeon
Joel H. Cooper (California politician) (1841–1899), California lawyer and legislator
Joel H. Cooper (Wisconsin politician) (1821–1893), Wisconsin doctor and Free Soil legislator
Joel Cooper (footballer) (born 1996), Northern Irish professional football player for Oxford United